Mitchell Lurie (born July 20, 1993) is an American soccer player.

Career

Youth and college 
Lurie played four years of college soccer, beginning at the University of Portland, before transferring to Louisville University and later Rutgers University for his senior year.

While at college, Lurie also appeared for Premier Development League sides Portland Timbers U23s and Ocean City Nor'easters.

Professional 
On January 19, 2016, Lurie was selected 44th overall in the 2016 MLS SuperDraft by Philadelphia Union. However, he wasn't signed by the club.

Lurie joined United Soccer League side Saint Louis FC on March 16, 2016. He logged over 1,000 minutes while appearing in 15 games.

Lurie was released by Saint Louis FC on November 10, 2016.

Personal

References

External links 
 

1993 births
Living people
American soccer players
Association football defenders
Portland Pilots men's soccer players
Louisville Cardinals men's soccer players
Rutgers Scarlet Knights men's soccer players
Portland Timbers U23s players
Ocean City Nor'easters players
Saint Louis FC players
Philadelphia Union draft picks
USL League Two players
USL Championship players
Soccer players from Atlanta
Soccer players from Portland, Oregon